Seventeen or Bust was a volunteer computing project started in March 2002 to solve the last seventeen cases in the Sierpinski problem.  The project solved eleven cases before a server loss in April 2016 forced it to cease operations.  Work on the Sierpinski problem moved to PrimeGrid, which solved a twelfth case in October 2016. Five cases remain unsolved .

Goals

The goal of the project was to prove that 78557 is the smallest Sierpinski number, that is, the least odd k such that k·2n+1 is composite (i.e. not prime) for all n > 0.
When the project began, there were only seventeen values of k < 78557 for which the corresponding sequence was not known to contain a prime.

For each of those seventeen values of k, the project searched for a prime number in the sequence
 k·21+1, k·22+1, …, k·2n+1, …
testing candidate values n using Proth's theorem.  If one was found, it proved that k was not a Sierpinski number.  If the goal had been reached, the conjectured answer 78557 to the Sierpinski problem would be proven true.

There is also the possibility that some of the sequences contain no prime numbers. In that case, the search would continue forever, searching for prime numbers where none can be found.  However, there is some empirical evidence suggesting the conjecture is true.

Every known Sierpinski number k has a small covering set, a finite set of primes with at least one dividing k·2n+1 for each n>0 (or else k has algebraic factorizations for some n values and a finite prime set that works only for the remaining n).  For example, for the smallest known Sierpinski number, 78557, the covering set is {3,5,7,13,19,37,73}. For another known Sierpinski number, 271129, the covering set is {3,5,7,13,17,241}.  Each of the remaining sequences has been tested and none has a small covering set, so it is suspected that each of them contains primes.

The second generation of the client was based on Prime95, which is used in the Great Internet Mersenne Prime Search.
In January 2010, the Seventeen or Bust project started collaboration with PrimeGrid which uses the software LLR for its tests related to the Sierpinski problem.

The Seventeen or Bust server went down during April 2016, when the server and backups were lost for reasons that were not revealed to the public. The project is no longer active. Work on the Sierpinski problem continues at PrimeGrid.

Progress of the search
Twelve prime numbers have been found to date, eleven by the original Seventeen or Bust, and a twelfth by PrimeGrid's SoB project:

 the largest of these primes, 10223·231172165+1, is the largest known prime number that is not a Mersenne prime. It was found in October 2016.  The primes on this list over one million digits in length are the six known "Colbert numbers" whimsically named after Stephen Colbert. These are defined as primes which eliminate a remaining Sierpinski number candidate.

Each of these numbers has enough digits to fill up a medium-sized novel, at least. The project was dividing numbers among its active users, in hope of finding a prime number in each of the five remaining sequences:

k·2n+1, for k = 21181, 22699, 24737, 55459, 67607.

In March 2017, n had exceeded 31,000,000 for the last five k values. At that time, PrimeGrid decided to suspend testing to do a double check of all those smaller n values for which the Proth test residue had been lost, or for which the result had not been successfully verified by two independent computations on different computers. Testing resumed after the double check was finally completed on October 10, 2019, taking about two and a half years.

The current status for the remaining multipliers can be seen at PrimeGrid's website.

Modular restrictions
Every multiplier has modular restrictions for the exponent n, assuming the latter exists. For example, for k = 21,181, it is sufficient to check only values of n congruent to 20 (mod 24); the covering set for all other terms is {3, 5, 7, 13, 17}. Similarly, for k = 22,699, only terms with n congruent to 46 (mod 72) are candidates, as the set of all other terms have covering set {3, 5, 7, 13, 17, 19, 73}.

See also

Riesel Sieve, a related volunteer computing project for numbers of the form k·2n−1
List of volunteer computing projects
PrimeGrid, biggest search for primes.
Computer-assisted proof

References

External links
 Seventeen or Bust homepage (historical) from Internet Archive
 PrimeGrid

Distributed prime searches
Analytic number theory
Projects established in 2002
Volunteer computing projects